Jesús Aranzabal Ojanguren (born 25 December 1939 in Bergara) is a Spanish former professional cyclist. Professional from 1964 to 1972, he notably won a stage of the 1972 Vuelta a España and the general classification of the 1966 Vuelta a Andalucía. He also finished 2nd and won a stage of the 1970 Tour of the Basque Country.

Major results

1963
 1st  Overall Vuelta al Bidasoa
1966
 1st  Overall Vuelta a Andalucía
 1st Clásica a los Puertos de Guadarrama
 1st Stage 2 Vuelta a Ávila
1967
 10th Overall Vuelta a Andalucía
1968
 1st Stage 3 Vuelta a Mallorca
 3rd National Road Race Championships
 3rd Trofeo Baracchi
1970
 2nd National Road Race Championships
 2nd Overall Tour of the Basque Country
1st Stage 5
 3rd Klasika Primavera
1971
 1st Stages 4 & 6b Volta a Portugal
1972
 1st Stage 17a Vuelta a España

References

External links

1939 births
Living people
Spanish male cyclists
Spanish Vuelta a España stage winners
People from Bergara
Cyclists from the Basque Country (autonomous community)
Sportspeople from Gipuzkoa